Mathematical Journal may refer to:

 Duke Mathematical Journal
 Tohoku Mathematical Journal

See also
 Journal of Mathematical Physics
 Journal of Mathematical Economics
 Journal of the American Mathematical Society